The Turopolje pig is a breed of pig named for Turopolje, Croatia, where it originates. This distinctive-looking swine, which has black spots on a white or grey skin with drooping ears, is very rare, and is likely nearing extinction. It is one of the older breeds of European pigs, though it may have had infusions of Berkshire or other bloodlines in the 19th century.

Though it is relatively small and not fast growing, the breed is known for its hardiness under free range conditions. Once one of the most widespread swine in its native country, the change from extensive to intensive pig farming in the mid-20th century discouraged its use.

References

External links 

 Carcass Composition of Turopolje Pig
 Turopolje pig origin

Picture of sleeping (and video of snoring) Turopolje pigs in South Tyrol: https://picasaweb.google.com/Fritz.Joern/HofSommer13#5912816864147895490 

Pig breeds
Pig breeds originating in Croatia